Memorial Stadium is the home of the University of North Dakota (UND) track and field teams.  It is located on the campus of UND in Grand Forks, North Dakota.  The stadium holds 10,000 people and opened in 1927. Memorial Stadium was home of the UND football from 1927 until 2001.  Today, the football team plays in the nearby Alerus Center; however, the team continues to utilize Memorial Stadium for team offices, training, and practices. 

In March of 2021, Memorial Stadium was demolished to make room for a new 25 million dollar building.  The new building will house athletic offices as well as market rate apartments.

References

College track and field venues in the United States
Defunct college football venues
North Dakota Fighting Hawks football
Sports venues in North Dakota
Buildings and structures in Grand Forks, North Dakota
American football venues in North Dakota
Athletics (track and field) venues in North Dakota
Sports venues completed in 1927
1927 establishments in North Dakota